Arif Virani  (born November 23, 1971) is a Canadian lawyer and politician who has sat as the member of Parliament (MP) for Parkdale—High Park since 2015. Virani represents the riding in the House of Commons as a member of the Liberal Party. He has held a number of parliamentary secretary portfolios, currently to the minister of justice and attorney general since 2018, and previously to the minister of immigration, refugees and citizenship from 2015 to 2017, and to the minister of Canadian heritage (multiculturalism) from 2017 to 2018.

Background
Virani's roots are in Ahmedabad, Gujarat, although he was born in Kampala. Virani is a multilingual Ismaili Muslim who came to Canada as a refugee from Uganda. Upon arriving in Canada in 1972 his family found solace in the Stanley Street YMCA in Montreal. His family then became more permanently established in Toronto. Virani spent his childhood growing up in the Flemingdon Park and Willowdale neighborhoods.

Education
Virani received a joint honours Bachelor of Arts in political science and history from McGill University in 1994. He then graduated from the University of Toronto Faculty of Law. Virani remained connected to the University of Toronto Faculty of Law following his graduation by remaining involved with its alumni committee.

Legal career
Virani began his legal career by articling for Fasken Martineau DuMoulin LLP in 1999. Following this he worked in London, United Kingdom for a year with the support of the Harold G. Fox scholarship. This scholarship for recent graduates of the Bar Admission Course allows for a pupilage with leading Barristers at the Inns of Court in London, United Kingdom. In 2003 he then went on to work as a lawyer for the constitutional law branch of the Ontario Ministry of the Attorney General. He does not currently practise law as he serves in his role as a Member of Parliament. He remains an L1 class licensed lawyer according to the Law Society of Ontario. This means he is "entitled to practise law in Ontario as a barrister and solicitor".

Personal life
Virani lives in Roncesvalles Village in Toronto with his wife Suchita Jain, originally from London, Ontario, and their two sons.

Electoral record

References

External links

Official website

Living people
Liberal Party of Canada MPs
Members of the House of Commons of Canada from Ontario
Canadian Ismailis
Canadian lawyers
International Criminal Court prosecutors
People from Old Toronto
Politicians from Toronto
Ugandan emigrants to Canada
McGill University alumni
University of Toronto Faculty of Law alumni
Canadian people of Gujarati descent
Applicants for refugee status in Canada
1971 births
21st-century Canadian politicians
Canadian politicians of Indian descent